The Todt family murders was a multiple homicide case that occurred in December 2019 in Disney's planned community of Celebration, Florida. Anthony "Tony" Todt, age 44, confessed to the murders of his wife, 42-year-old Megan Todt, and their three children: Alek, age 13; Tyler, age 11; and Zoe, age 4. Anthony was a physical therapist who had recently been served a federal warrant for health care fraud charges stemming from his physical therapy business. Authorities coming to issue the warrant found the man living in his house with the badly decomposed bodies of his entire family, including the family dog. In 2022, Anthony Todt was convicted of the murders and sentenced to life imprisonment without the possibility of parole. An additional year was added for the killing of the pet dog, deemed an act of animal cruelty.

Background
Anthony Todt's father, Robert Todt, was arrested in July 1980 and charged with hiring one of his former students to shoot and kill his wife, Loretta in order to marry his mistress. Anthony Todt was just four years old at the time, and witnessed the attack on his mother.  The would-be assassin, strictly ordered to harm no one else but Loretta, did not harm Anthony. Loretta survived the bullet to her head, and went on to remarry.

Anthony Todt dated Megan, a physical therapist and a yoga instructor, in college, and the two later married. The couple worked together at a shared physical therapy clinic they owned. After their children were born, Megan then became a stay-at-home mother, while Anthony managed their clinic.

The family was well known by neighbors, and the Todt children were encouraged to get involved in the arts and music. Anthony often volunteered as a youth soccer coach, and he also worked with disabled children. In 2017, according to Anthony, Megan contracted Lyme Disease after a tick bite during a trip to Disney World. She then suffered from bouts of depression, and became more reserved and isolated.

The Todt family moved to Celebration, Florida after living in Connecticut for several years. Anthony Todt continued working in Connecticut at the clinic, and visited the family weekly. Formerly active in their Connecticut community, the Todts were withdrawn and uninvolved with their neighbors in Celebration. By 2019, Anthony had gained a significant amount of weight and received a diagnosis of diabetes.

In April 2019, it was discovered that Anthony was charging patients for care that they had never received. An investigation ensued, which revealed Anthony was using the excess money to pay for the family home in Celebration, as well as trips to Disney World. Anthony had taken additional loans from firms in New York City who sued him for failure to pay; Todt was over $100,000 in debt.

Todt initially maintained his innocence with investigators, but eventually relented and admitted to the fraud. It is believed by investigators that Megan Todt and the children had no idea about the fraud, as they were uninvolved with the business.

Murders
Anthony Todt's motive for the murders is unclear, as his testimony about them changed multiple  times. At one point, he had claimed Megan attempted suicide by stabbing herself in her liver after killing the children; in other testimony, he said he was trying to save the family from "the Apocalypse" and join them in the afterlife.

While the Todts usually returned to Connecticut from Florida during the winter to enjoy the snowy weather, in 2019, they remained in Celebration. An initial welfare check by police revealed nothing out of the ordinary, but investigators from the U.S. Department of Health and Human Services Office of Inspector General and Osceola County deputies returned on January 13, 2020 after disturbing cell phone texts began appearing on family members' phones from Anthony Todt.

Despite the Todts presence in Florida, mail piled up on the porch of the home, and an eviction notice was placed on the door. A warrant was issued for Anthony's arrest, and authorities arrived at the home. Anthony wandered out of his house shaking strangely. Obtaining a key from the property's landlord, authorities entered the home and discovered a pungent odor. In beds throughout the house, family members were discovered stabbed in their stomachs and smothered to death with crucifixes gripped in their hands. Zoe Todt had decomposed to the point that authorities initially couldn't find her until they examined Megan's corpse and saw Zoe's body beneath her feet. The family dog, Breezy, was lying dead on the floor in her dog bed in the master bedroom.

Anthony himself had consumed a large amount of Benadryl in what he claimed was a suicide attempt. The children had also been drugged with Benadryl.

Perpetrator
 Anthony John Todt (born September 29, 1975), age 47

Victims
 Megan Todt, age 42, wife of Anthony Todt
 Aleksander "Alek" Todt, age 13, son
 Tyler Todt, age 11, son
 Zoe Todt, age 4, daughter
 Breezy (family dog)

Sentence
Anthony claimed an inability to recall the events of the murders, and also testified that his initial confession had been made under duress. He did eventually confess to the murders after telling a story about returning to the family home to look for a missing silver Mickey Mouse necklace belonging to his daughter Zoe.

In 2022, Anthony Todt was sentenced to life in prison without the possibility of parole. In a landmark move, one year of additional incarceration was added to his sentence for animal cruelty charges stemming from his killing the family dog.

See also 

 Crime in Florida
 Familicide

References

External links 

 Florida Department of Children and Families, Child Fatality Summary, April 30, 2020
 Anthony John Todt, Osceola County Inmate Search

2019 murders in the United States
Familicides
Murder in Florida
Animal cruelty incidents